Arthur Peters (4 June 1904 – 22 September 1988) was a South African cricketer. He played in seven first-class matches from 1931/32 and 1936/37.

References

External links
 

1904 births
1988 deaths
South African cricketers
Border cricketers
Cricketers from Cape Town